Nickel Belt is a provincial electoral district located in the Canadian province of Ontario. It elects one member to the Legislative Assembly of Ontario. The district is located in Northern Ontario and includes much of the eastern and southern parts of the District of Sudbury, as well as most of Greater Sudbury outside the city's urban core. Communities include Lively, Onaping, Levack, Dowling, Chelmsford, Naughton, Azilda, Coniston, Wahnapitae, Garson, Val Caron, Val Thérèse, Hanmer and Capreol.

Boundary redistribution

Prior to redistribution in 1998, the district included all of Sudbury District except the southeastern portion, as well as the western half of what was then the Regional Municipality of Sudbury (Walden, Rayside-Balfour and Onaping Falls). The eastern half of the current Nickel Belt comprised the separate district of Sudbury East.

In 1998, Ontario was divided into the same electoral districts as those used for federal electoral purposes. They were redistributed whenever a readjustment took place at the federal level. This change resulted in Sudbury East being reabsorbed back into Nickel Belt.

In 2005, legislation was passed by the Legislature to divide Ontario into 107 electoral districts, beginning with the next provincial election in 2007. The eleven northern electoral districts, including Nickel Belt, are those defined for federal purposes in 1996, based on the 1991 census (except for a minor boundary adjustment). The 96 southern electoral districts are those defined for federal electoral purposes in 2003, based on the 2001 census. Without this legislation, the number of electoral districts in northern Ontario would have been reduced from eleven to ten.

This change primarily affects the Walden area, which is part of the Sudbury riding federally but remains in Nickel Belt provincially, and the West Nipissing area, which is part of Nickel Belt federally but Timiskaming—Cochrane provincially.

Members of Provincial Parliament

Election results since 1977

2007 electoral reform referendum

Notes

Sources
 Elections Ontario Results
1999 results
2003 results
2007 results
Map of riding for 2018 election

Ontario provincial electoral districts
Politics of Greater Sudbury
Sudbury District